This is a list of visitor attractions and annual events in the Louisville metropolitan area.

Annual festivals and other events

Spring
 Abbey Road on the River, a salute to The Beatles with many bands, held Memorial Day weekend in Louisville 2005–2016, but moved across the river to Jeffersonville, Indiana in 2017
 Cherokee Triangle Art Fair, held the weekend before the Kentucky Derby
 ConGlomeration, a multigenre convention held in April
 Festival of Faiths, a five-day national interfaith gathering featuring music, poetry, film, art and dialogue with internationally renowned spiritual leaders, thinkers and practitioners, held at Actors Theatre of Louisville in May
 Highland Renaissance Festival in Eminence, festivities that reproduce aspects of Scottish life during the Renaissance period, along with highland games, held from late May through early July
 Hillbilly Outfield: Kentucky Derby party (Middletown), held in early May to coincide with the Kentucky Derby
 Humana Festival of New American Plays, held in the spring
 Kentucky Derby Festival, Kentucky's largest single annual event; includes Thunder Over Louisville, Great Steamboat Race, Great Balloon Race, Pegasus Parade and the Marathon/miniMarathon, and is held for two weeks from late April through early May, leading up to the Kentucky Oaks and Kentucky Derby thoroughbred races
 Kentucky Reggae Festival, held Memorial Day weekend
 Machine Gun Shoot, the first of two events for machine gun enthusiasts held at Knob Creek Gun Range in Bullitt County; usually on the second weekend of April
 Starlight Strawberry Festival (Starlight, Indiana), held during Memorial Day weekend
 VEX Robotics World Championships, held Wednesday through Saturday in the week of the Kentucky Derby (2015–17)
 WHAS Crusade for Children, fundraiser held over the first weekend in June

Summer

 Jane Austen Festival, a three-day event and the largest Jane Austen event in North America, held on the third weekend of July at Locust Grove
 Derby City Comic Con, held in late June
 Fandom Fest Comic Expo, held in mid-summer
 Forecastle Festival, a three-day nationally renowned music, art and environmental activism festival, held in July
 Fright Night Film Fest, typically held in July
 Jeffersontown Gaslight Festival (Jeffersontown), held in September
 Kentucky Art Car Weekend, held in August
 Kentucky Bourbon Festival (Bardstown), held in September
 Kentucky Shakespeare Festival (commonly called "Shakespeare in Central Park"), with the main productions being a series of plays presented free to the public at Central Park during the summer
 Kentucky State Fair, Kentucky's official state fair, which runs for 11 days at the Kentucky Exposition Center; includes amusements, exhibits, competitions, concerts and the World's Championship Horse Show, ends on the last Sunday of August
 Kentuckiana Pride Festival, series of events in June (around start of summer) in support of LGBT pride and rights
 Lebowski Fest, held in July
 Louisville Zombie Attack, where thousands of locals dressed and made up as zombies walk down Bardstown Road to a set location; annual event traditionally held on August 29 at 8:29 pm, but now held on the last Saturday in August at the same clock time
 Oktoberfest, held in September (late summer)
 St. Joseph Orphans Picnic, held the second Saturday in August
 Steamboat Days (Jeffersonville, Indiana), three-day festival held in early September
 Street Rod Nationals, held from Thursday to Sunday in the first full week of August
 WorldFest, a four-day international festival, held on Labor Day weekend

Fall
 Asylum Haunted Scream Park, the subject of the documentary Monsters Wanted, this is five haunted attractions in one location; held from mid-September through Halloween
 Cropped Out, a multi-venue music festival, held in early fall
 Danger Run, from the end of September through the end of October
 Farmington Harvest Festival, held the second Sunday in October at Farmington Historic Plantation
 Garvin Gate Blues Festival, held in Old Louisville in October
 IdeaFestival, a three-day conference that seeks to engage attendees with innovative thinking, held in early fall
 Light Up Louisville & 40 Nights of Lights, begins the day after Thanksgiving
 Machine Gun Shoot, Knob Creek Range's second machine gun-centric event of the year, typically held on the second weekend of October
 National FFA Organization Convention & Expo, previously held in Indianapolis, Indiana, was moved to Louisville again in 2013 after a 14-year absence, held in late October/early November
 North American International Livestock Exposition, held in November
 Spirit Ball, a Victorian-inspired masquerade ball held annually the Saturday before Halloween at the Conrad-Caldwell House on St. James Court
 St. James Court Art Show, one of the top-ranked shows of its kind in the country; held in Old Louisville the first weekend of October
 The World's Largest Halloween Party, Louisville Zoo, held 14 nights in October
Big Four Bridge Arts Festival, held on the first weekend after labor day.

Winter
 Carl Casper's Custom Auto Show, held in February at the Kentucky Exposition Center
 Kosair Shrine Circus, held in February
 Louisville Boat, RV & Sportshow, held in January
 National Farm Machinery Show, held in February

Distinctive locales

Louisville Metro
 East Market District (NuLu), featuring many art galleries and restaurants, prominently featured in the monthly First Friday Hop
 The Highlands area, which features:
 Distinctive shops, restaurants and nightlife along Baxter Avenue and Bardstown Road
 Cherokee Triangle and Original Highlands historic neighborhoods
 Frankfort Avenue, including the Clifton and Crescent Hill neighborhoods—another area with distinctive shops and restaurants
 Louisville Urban Bourbon Trail
 Old Louisville, the third largest historic preservation district in the U.S., which features:
 the highest number of buildings of Victorian architecture in a U.S. neighborhood
 Louisville's Central Park
 St. James Court, famous for the annual St. James Court Art Show
 The West Main District of downtown, including "Museum Row" and featuring some of the oldest structures in the city

Southern Indiana
 Corydon Historic District
 Mansion Row Historic District (New Albany)
 New Albany Downtown Historic District
 Old Jeffersonville Historic District

Historic properties

 Basilica of St. Joseph Proto-Cathedral (Bardstown), the first Roman Catholic cathedral west of the Appalachian Mountains
 Belle of Louisville, the oldest Mississippi-style steamboat in operation on the inland waterways of the U.S. (built 1914–1915 in Pittsburgh for service in Memphis as the Idlewild, renamed Avalon in 1948, purchased by Jefferson County and renamed Belle of Louisville in 1962)
 Bray Place, the land and 1796 home, now called the Bashford Manor Bed and Breakfast, one of the oldest houses in Kentucky
 The Brennan House
 Brown Hotel, where the Hot Brown was invented
 Cathedral of the Assumption
 Colgate Clock (Clarksville, Indiana), the fourth largest clock in the United States
 Colonial Gardens, a local landmark in the Kenwood Hill neighborhood, now undergoing redevelopment
 Conrad-Caldwell House
 Crescent Hill Reservoir
 Culbertson Mansion State Historic Site (New Albany, Indiana), most noted for its annual haunted house located in the mansion's carriage barn
 Farmington Historic Plantation, including the Thomas Jefferson-designed home of the Speed family, visited by Abraham Lincoln
 The Filson Historical Society, a historical society and research library housed in the Ferguson Mansion, a Beaux-Arts style mansion built in 1906
 Fort Duffield, a Civil War fort
 Fort Knox, including the U.S. Bullion Depository and General George Patton Museum of Leadership (Bullitt, Hardin and Meade Counties)
 Fort Nelson Park, located in the same spot as the second on-shore fort in Kentucky
 Historic Locust Grove farm, home of George Rogers Clark and site of the homecoming of Lewis and Clark
 Hogan's Fountain Pavilion, a large gazebo and picnic shelter of mid-century modern architecture located in Cherokee Park
 Little Loomhouse
 Louisville Stoneware, making pottery since 1815
 My Old Kentucky Home State Park (Bardstown), featuring the Federal Hill mansion (inspiration for Stephen Foster's My Old Kentucky Home) and Stephen Foster - The Musical 
 Peterson-Dumesnil House
 Riverside, The Farnsley-Moremen Landing
 Scribner House (New Albany, Indiana)
 Seelbach Hotel, the famous hotel written about by F. Scott Fitzgerald and frequently visited by Al Capone
 Spalding Hall (Bardstown)
 Thomas Edison House
 Union Station
 United States Marine Hospital of Louisville
 Vogue Theater, a movie theater in St. Matthews that closed in 1998, known for showing The Rocky Horror Picture Show for 25 years. Its sign is being refurbished as a historical landmark.
 Waverly Hills Sanatorium
 Whiskey Row, located in the first block of West Main Street, a collection of Revivalist and Chicago School-style buildings with cast-iron storefronts built between 1852 and 1905 
 Whitehall House & Gardens
 Whitney Young Birthplace and Museum

National Register of Historic Places listings

Museums, galleries and interpretive centers

Art

 21c Museum Hotel
 Carnegie Center for Art & History (New Albany, Indiana)
 Kentucky Museum of Art and Craft
 Speed Art Museum

Regional history

 Falls of the Ohio State Park interpretive center, a museum covering the natural history related to findings in the nearby exposed Devonian fossil beds as well as the human history of the Louisville area
 The Filson Historical Society, features a museum and extensive historical collections, currently undergoing major expansion
 Historic Locust Grove Visitors Center, which includes a museum
 Howard Steamboat Museum (Jeffersonville, Indiana)
 Kentucky Derby Museum
 Kentucky Railway Museum (New Haven)
 Louisville Slugger Museum & Factory
 My Old Kentucky Home State Park (Bardstown)
 Portland Museum
 Riverside, The Farnsley-Moremen Landing Visitors Center, which includes a museum
 Thomas Edison House
 Whitney Young Birthplace and Museum

Bourbon

 Evan Williams Bourbon Experience, located on Louisville's Whiskey Row, featuring bourbon history and tastings, and interprets Louisville's wharf history in the 1790s
 Heaven Hill Distilleries Bourbon Heritage Center (Bardstown)
 Jim Beam American Stillhouse (Clermont)
 Oscar Getz Museum of Whiskey History (Bardstown)
 Stitzel-Weller Distillery (Shively)

Cities

 Bardstown Historical Museum (Bardstown)
 Corydon Capitol State Historic Site (Corydon, Indiana)
 Historic Middletown Museum
 Jeffersontown Historical Museum (Jeffersontown)

Counties

 The Bullitt County History Museum (Shepherdsville)
 Clark County Museum (Jeffersonville, Indiana)
 Henry County Historical Society (New Castle)
 Oldham County History Center (La Grange)

More regional historical collections can be found at the Louisville Free Public Library and the University of Louisville.

U.S. and world history

 Museum of the American Printing House for the Blind
 Civil War Museum (Bardstown), including the Civil War Museum of the Western Theater, Pioneer Village, Women's Civil War Museum, War Memorial of Mid America and the Wildlife Museum
 Frazier History Museum, features war weaponry and related historical artifacts, especially focusing on British and U.S. conflicts
 John Hay Center
 Louisville Slugger Museum & Factory, showcases the history of the Louisville Slugger and baseball in general
 National Society of the Sons of the American Revolution, features a historical museum and a genealogical collection
 General George Patton Museum of Leadership (Fort Knox)

Other subjects

 Kentucky Science Center, hands-on science museum featuring a four-story digital theater
 Louisville WaterWorks Museum, located at the Louisville Water Tower
 Muhammad Ali Center
 Schimpff's Candy Museum (Jeffersonville)
 Thomas Merton Center

Parks and other outdoor attractions

 

Louisville is home to many spacious city parks, several designed by Frederick Law Olmsted, as well as forested areas, trails and other outdoor attractions; distinctive examples include:

 Beargrass Creek State Nature Preserve
 Bernheim Arboretum and Research Forest (Bullitt County)
 Big Four Bridge, a pedestrian and bicycle bridge connecting Louisville and Jeffersonville, Indiana
 Blackacre Nature Preserve and Historic Homestead
 Bridges to the Past (Fort Knox), closed indefinitely due to work on railroad bridge
 Camp Carlson (Fort Knox)
 Cave Hill Cemetery
 Central Park
 Cherokee Park, includes the Hogan's Fountain Pavilion and Cherokee Golf Course, and many other landmarks and features
 Falls of the Ohio National Wildlife Conservation Area (Clarksville, Indiana), which includes Falls of the Ohio State Park and features the oldest exposed Devonian fossil beds in the United States
 Huber's Orchard, Winery and Vineyards (Starlight, Indiana)
 Indiana Caverns (near Corydon, Indiana)
 Iroquois Park, includes the locally popular Iroquois Amphitheater, scenic overlooks and the Iroquois Golf Course
 Jefferson Memorial Forest, in southwest Louisville, the largest municipal urban forest in the United States
 Kentucky Kingdom and Hurricane Bay, previously known as Six Flags Kentucky Kingdom, a  amusement park with 50 amusement rides and a water park. Named by MSN Travel as one of the top ten amusement parks in America for 2015.
 Louisville Clock, formerly at Theatre Square (dismantled in 2015)
 Louisville Loop, a partially completed  bike and pedestrian trail encircling Louisville, including:
 Riverwalk
 Levee Trail
 Mill Creek Trail
 Louisville Water Tower Park
 Louisville Waterfront Park, features annual Thunder Over Louisville fireworks and air show during the Kentucky Derby Festival
 Louisville Zoo
 McAlpine Locks and Dam
 Mega Cavern
 Otter Creek Outdoor Recreation Area (Meade County)
 The Parklands of Floyds Fork
 Patriots Peace Memorial
 Renaissance Fun Park (Middletown)
 Riverfront Plaza/Belvedere, adjacent to Downtown Louisville and Louisville's wharf
 E. P. "Tom" Sawyer State Park
 Seneca Park, includes the Seneca Golf Course
 Shawnee Park, includes the Shawnee Golf Course
 Squire Boone Caverns (Mauckport, Indiana)
 Tioga Falls Hiking Trail (Fort Knox), closed indefinitely due to work on railroad bridge
 Waverly Park, includes the 9-hole Bobby Nichols Golf Course
 Zachary Taylor National Cemetery

Shows and performing arts

Venues

 Actors Theatre, producing the Humana Festival of New American Plays, among many other productions
 The Alley Theater
 Baxter Avenue Filmworks, with a monthly audience participation showing of The Rocky Horror Picture Show
 Horseshoe Southern Indiana (Elizabeth, Indiana)
 Derby Dinner Playhouse (Clarksville, Indiana)
 Fourth Street Live!, a downtown entertainment and retail complex
 Gheens Science Hall and Rauch Planetarium (University of Louisville)
 Headliners Music Hall
 IMAX theaters at the Kentucky Science Center and Showcase Stonybrook Cinemas
 Iroquois Amphitheater
 The Kentucky Center
 KFC Yum! Center
 The Laughing Derby at Comedy Caravan
 Louisville Gardens
 The Louisville Palace
 Mercury Ballroom

Performers
 Kentucky Shakespeare Festival
 Little Colonel Players (Pewee Valley)
 Louisville Chorus
 Louisville Orchestra
 Louisville Thoroughbreds
 Mind's Eye Theatre Company
 Pandora Productions
 Squallis Puppeteers
 StageOne Family Theatre
 Theatre [502]
 Voices of Kentuckiana
 Wayward Actors Company

Sports-related attractions and venues

 Alpine Ice Arena
 David Armstrong Extreme Park
 Churchill Downs thoroughbred racetrack and the Kentucky Derby Museum
 Freedom Hall
 KFC Yum! Center, home of University of Louisville basketball
 Kentucky International Convention Center
 Knob Creek Gun Range (in Bullitt County near West Point), famous for its twice-yearly machine gun shoot
 Lindsey Golf Course (Fort Knox)
 Louisville Champions Park, a park that "offers flexible space for a variety of field sports", including soccer
 Louisville Metro Parks public golf courses
Cherokee Park (9-hole)
Crescent Hill Park (9-hole)
Iroquois Park
Long Run Park
Seneca Park
Shawnee Park
Sun Valley Park
Charlie Vettiner Park
Waverly Park (Bobby Nichols) (9-hole)
 Louisville Slugger Field, a baseball park that is home to the Louisville Bats
 Louisville Slugger Museum & Factory
 Lynn Stadium, home of University of Louisville soccer
 Lynn Family Stadium, not to be confused with the above; home of Louisville City FC (USL Championship) and Racing Louisville FC (NWSL)
 Muhammad Ali Center
 Owsley B. Frazier Stadium, home of several outdoor sports at Bellarmine University, most notably men's lacrosse
 Cardinal Stadium, home of University of Louisville football
 Jim Patterson Stadium, home of University of Louisville baseball
 Valhalla Golf Club, designed by professional golfer Jack Nicklaus

Miscellaneous
 Rooster Run (Nelson County), a general store well known for baseball caps featuring its logo and a -tall fiberglass rooster statue standing in front of the store. According to The Kentucky Encyclopedia, it is "one of the best-known general stores in the country and one of Kentucky's best-known unincorporated businesses".

See also

References

External links
 36 Hours in Louisville, Ky.—New York Times, March 31, 2011
 Bucket List: The top 50 things to do in Louisville—WLKY, August 18, 2013
 Greater Louisville Convention and Visitors Bureau
 LouisvilleHotBytes restaurant reviews
 Louisville Olmsted Parks Conservancy

Louisville
 
 
 Attractions and events